Myrmolimosina is a genus of flies belonging to the family Lesser Dung flies.

Species
B. andersoni Marshall, 2000

References

Sphaeroceridae
Diptera of North America
Brachycera genera